O'Connor Peak is a mountain peak, 675 m, standing west of Long Point on Barff Peninsula, South Georgia. Charted by a Norwegian Antarctic Expedition, 1927–28, and named Mount Bryde. Recharted by DI in 1929 and named after Midshipman W. P. O'Connor, Royal Navy Reserve, who assisted with the survey.

Mountains of Antarctica